María Díaz de Padilla ( 1334 –Seville, July 1361) was the legitimate first wife of King Peter of Castile.

Family 

She was a Castilian noblewoman, daughter of Juan García de Padilla (died between 1348 and 1351) and his wife María de Henestrosa (died after September 1356). Her maternal uncle was Juan Fernández de Henestrosa, the King's favorite between 1354 and 1359 after Juan Alfonso de Alburquerque fell out of favor, and the mediator in an apparent pardon for Fadrique Alfonso, King Peter's half-brother. She was also the sister of  Diego García de Padilla, Grand Master of the Order of Calatrava.  María’s family, members of the regional nobility, originally came from the area of Padilla de Abajo, near Castrojeriz in the province of Burgos.

She is described in the chronicles of her time as very beautiful, intelligent, and small of body.

Relationship with King Peter of Castile 
King Peter met María in the summer of 1352 during an expedition to Asturias to battle his rebellious half-brother Henry. It was probably her maternal uncle, Juan Fernández de Henestrosa, who introduced them, as mentioned in the chronicle of King Peter’s reign written by Pero López de Ayala.  At that time, María was being raised at the house of Isabel de Meneses, wife of Juan Alfonso de Alburquerque, a powerful nobleman. They became lovers and their relationship lasted until her death despite the King’s other marriages and affairs. The Padillas were raised to various offices and dignities. Her uncle, Henestrosa, became Alcalde de los fidalgos.

In the summer of 1353, under coercion from family and the main court favorite, Juan Alfonso de Alburquerque, Peter wed Blanche of Bourbon, the first cousin of King John II of France. Peter abandoned Blanche within three days when he learned that she had an affair with his bastard brother Fadrique Alfonso en route to Spain, and that the dowry was not coming.

Children
María and Peter had three daughters: Beatrice (1353–1369), Constance (1354–1394), and Isabella (1355–1392), and a son, Alfonso, crown-prince of Castile (1359 - October 19, 1362).

Two of their daughters were married to sons of Edward III, King of England. Isabella married Edmund of Langley, 1st Duke of York, while the elder, Constance, married John of Gaunt, 1st Duke of Lancaster, leading him to claim the crown of Castile on behalf of his wife. Constance's daughter, Catherine of Lancaster,  married Henry III of Castile in order to reunify any claim to succession that may have passed via Constance.

Death and burial 

María de Padilla died in July 1361, possibly a victim of the plague, although Pero López de Ayala does not specify the cause in his chronicle of the King's reign.  
She was buried in the Real Monasterio de Santa Clara de Astudillo which she had founded in 1353.  Shortly afterwards, however, her remains were taken, following the orders of King Peter, to the Cathedral of Seville where she received burial in the Royal Chapel with other members of the royal house.

Depictions in fiction
Gaetano Donizetti composed Maria Padilla (1841), an opera about her relationship with King Peter.
Rudolf Gottschall wrote Maria de Padilla (18??), a drama about her life.
Beverly Adam wrote Maria de Padilla, The Secret Queen of Castile, a romance about her life.

Ancestry

Notes

References

Bibliography 
 
 
 
 
 

1330s births
1361 deaths
Year of birth uncertain
Mistresses of Spanish royalty
Castilian nobility
14th-century Castilians
14th-century Spanish women